Cerithiopsis apexcostata is a species of very small sea snail, a marine gastropod mollusc in the familyCerithiopsidae. This species was described by Emilio Rolán, José Espinosa, and Fernández-Garcés in 2007.

References

apexcostata
Gastropods described in 2007